Roseway is a ship.

Roseway may also refer to:
 Roseway, Nova Scotia
 Roseway, Portland, Oregon
 Roseway Waldorf School
 Roseway (horse)